Sundadoxa is a monotypic moth genus in the family Geometridae erected by Jeremy Daniel Holloway in 1996. Its only species, Sundadoxa multidentata, was first described by Louis Beethoven Prout in 1916. It is found in Brunei, Sumatra in Indonesia, Sarawak and Peninsular Malaysia.

References

External links

Pseudoterpnini
Geometridae genera
Monotypic moth genera
Moths described in 1916
Moths of Asia